Maksim Nikolayevich Zhivnovitskiy (born 25 July 1984) is a former Russian professional football player.

Club career
He played seven seasons in the Russian Football National League for FC SKA-Energiya Khabarovsk.

External links
 
 

1984 births
Living people
Russian footballers
Association football midfielders
Association football forwards
FC SKA-Khabarovsk players
FC Sakhalin Yuzhno-Sakhalinsk players
FC Smena Komsomolsk-na-Amure players
FC Chita players
FC Amur Blagoveshchensk players